Andreas Schweizer (born 26 September 1979) is a Swiss former gymnast. He competed at the 2004 Summer Olympics where he finished eighth in the still rings final and twenty-fourth in the all around final.

References

External links
 

1979 births
Living people
Swiss male artistic gymnasts
Olympic gymnasts of Switzerland
Gymnasts at the 2004 Summer Olympics
People from Wetzikon
Sportspeople from the canton of Zürich